Oliver Bowles (died ) was an English Presbyterian minister and divine.

Life 
Oliver Bowles, minister of Sutton, was one of the oldest members of the Westminster Assembly. He attained the degree of B.D., and was tutor to John Preston at Queen's College, Cambridge. He probably died in or before 1646. However, some sources report that Timothy Cruso was impressed by the dying counsels of Bowles (died 5 September 1674), who advised him never to trouble his hearers "with useless or contending notions, but rather preach all in practicals". His son was the Presbyterian minister Edward Bowles.

Works 
He was author of:

 Zeale for God's House quickned: a Fast Sermon before the Assembly of the Lords, Commons, and Divines, 1643, 4to.
 De Pastore Evangelico, 1649, 4to; 1655 and 1659, 16mo (published by his son, and dedicated to the Earl of Manchester).

References

Sources 

 

Attribution:

Further reading 

 Kirby, Ethan Williams (1964). "The English Presbyterians in the Westminster Assembly". Church History, 33(4): pp. 418–428. 
 "Oliver Bowles (1574-1644)". A Puritan's Mind. Retrieved 24 September 2022.

1640s deaths
English Presbyterian ministers
17th-century English writers

Year of birth missing
Year of death uncertain